The 2009–10 Biathlon World Cup – World Cup 7 was the seventh event of the season and was held in Kontiolahti, Finland from Friday, March 12 until Sunday, March 14, 2010.

Schedule of events
The schedule of the event is below

Medal winners

Men

Women

Mixed

Achievements
 Best performance for all time

 , 9 place in Sprint
 , 28 place in Sprint
 , 42 place in Sprint
 , 55 place in Sprint
 , 65 place in Sprint
 , 67 place in Sprint
 , 99 place in Sprint
 , 1 place in Pursuit
 , 2 place in Pursuit
 , 10 place in Pursuit
 , 18 place in Pursuit
 , 1 places in Sprint and Pursuit
 , 4 places in Sprint and Pursuit
 , 15 place in Sprint
 , 32 place in Sprint
 , 37 place in Sprint
 , 59 place in Sprint and 56 place in Pursuit
 , 65 place in Sprint
 , 71 place in Sprint
 , 76 place in Sprint
 , 79 place in Sprint
 , 81 place in Sprint
 , 45 place in Pursuit

 First World Cup race

 , 44 place in Sprint
 , 89 place in Sprint
 , 90 place in Sprint
 , 108 place in Sprint
 , 109 place in Sprint
 , 54 place in Sprint
 , 64 place in Sprint

References

- World Cup 7, 2009-10 Biathlon World Cup
2010 in Finnish sport
Biathlon competitions in Finland
March 2010 sports events in Europe
Kontiolahti